Alonzo B. Cook (July 31, 1866 – December 22, 1956) was an American politician who served as Massachusetts Auditor from 1915 to 1931 and was a candidate for Mayor of Boston in 1925 and in 1937; and United States Senator in 1936. As of 2020, he was the last Massachusetts Auditor who was a Republican.

Biography
He was born on July 31, 1866, to Levi F. Cook and Eliza Ryan. One of his brothers, Washington Cook, was also involved in politics.

Further reading
Howard, Richard T.: Public Officials of Massachusetts, page 28, (1919).
''Who's who in State Politics, 1915, Boston, MA: Practical Politics, (1915), page 42.

References

 

State auditors of Massachusetts
1866 births
1956 deaths
Massachusetts Republicans